Williams is a common European surname. This list provides links to biographies of people who share this common surname.

Common combinations of given name and surname Williams

Aaron Williams
Alan Williams
Albert Williams
Alex Williams
Alexander Williams
Alfred Williams
Allison Williams
Andrew or Andy Williams
Angela Williams
Ann, Anna, or Anne Williams
Annie Williams
Anthony or Antony Williams
Arnold Williams
Arthur or Art Williams
Ashley Williams
Avery Williams
Barbara Williams
Barney Williams
Barry Williams
Basil Williams
Ben Williams
Benjamin Williams
Bernard Williams
Bernie Williams
Bill Williams
Billy Williams
Bob, Bobbie, or Bobby Williams
Brad Williams
Brandon Williams
Brett Williams
Brian Williams
Bruce Williams
Bryan Williams
Carl Williams
Chad Williams
Charles or Charlie Williams
Chris Williams
Christopher Williams
Chuck Williams
Clarence Williams
Claude Williams
Clifford Williams
Colin Williams
Connor Williams
Corey Williams 
Craig Williams
Darryl Williams
Daryl Williams
Dave Williams
Davey Williams
David Williams
Dean Williams
Dennis or Denis Williams
Derek Williams
Desmond Williams
 Devon Williams
Dick Williams
Don Williams
Donald Williams
Doug or Douglas Williams
Earl Williams
Edward, Ed, or Eddie Williams
Edwin Williams
Eric or Erik Williams
Eugene Williams
Evan Williams
Francis Williams
Frank Williams
Fred Williams
Frederick Williams
Freddie Williams
Gareth Williams
Gary or Garry Williams
Geoff Williams
George Williams
Gerald Williams
Gordon Williams
Graham Williams
Grant Williams
Greg Williams
Gus Williams
Guy Williams
Hank Williams
Harold Williams
Harry Williams
Harvey Williams
Heather Williams
Helen Williams
Henry Williams
Hugh Williams
Ian Williams
Isaac Williams
Isaiah Williams
Jack Williams
Jackie Williams
James Williams
Jane Williams
Jarren Williams
Jason Williams
Jay Williams
Jeff or Jeffrey Williams
Jeremy Williams
Jerry Williams
Jesse Williams
Jim, Jimmy, or Jimy Williams
Jody Williams
Joe Williams
Joel Williams
John, Johnnie, or Johnny Williams
Jonah Williams
Jonathan Williams
Jordan Williams
Joseph Williams
Josh or Joshua Williams
Keith Williams
Ken Williams
Kenneth Williams
Kenny Williams
Kent Williams
Kevin Williams
Kimberley or Kim Williams
Kyle Williams
Larry Williams
Lauren Williams
Laurie Williams
Lawrence Williams
Lee Williams
Leo Williams
Leon Williams
Leonard Williams
Leslie Williams
Lewis Williams
Linda Williams
Lloyd Williams
Lorenzo Williams
Louis Williams
Luke Williams
Lynn Williams
Malcolm Williams
Marcus Williams
Mark Williams
Martin Williams
Marvin Williams
Mary Williams
Matthew or Matt Williams
Maurice Williams
Max Williams
Melvin Williams
Michael Williams
Mike Williams
Morgan Williams
Nathan Williams
Neil Williams
Nelson Williams
Nick Williams
Nicole Williams
Nigel Williams
Norman Williams
Oscar Williams
Owen Williams
Patrick or Pat Williams
Paul Williams
Peter or Pete Williams
Phil Williams
Philip Williams
Ralph Williams
Ray or Raymond Williams
Reg or Reginald Williams
Reggie Williams
Rhys Williams
Richard Williams
Ricky or Rick Williams
Robert, Rob, or Robbie Williams
Robin Williams
Rodney or Rod Williams
Roger Williams
Ronald or Ron Williams
Rowland Williams
Roy Williams
Russell Williams
Ryan Williams
Sam Williams
Samuel Williams
Sandra Williams
Sarah Williams
Scott Williams
Sean Williams
Seth Williams
Shannon Williams
Shaun Williams
Sid, Syd, or Sidney Williams
Simon Williams
Stan or Stanley Williams
Stephen or Steven Williams
Steve Williams
Stuart Williams
Susan Williams
Ted Williams
Terry Williams
Thomas Williams
Tim Williams
Timothy Williams
Todd Williams
Tom, Tommie, or Tommy Williams
Tony Williams
Travis Williams
Trevor Williams
Victoria Williams
Vince Williams
Walter Williams
Warren Williams
Wendy Williams
William Williams
Willie Williams

A
Abi Williams, Welsh nationalist politician
Abigail Williams (1680–1690s), American accuser in the Salem witch trials
Abiodun Williams (born 1961), academic in peacekeeping and conflict prevention and management
Abraham J. Williams (1781–1839), American politician, 3rd Governor of Missouri
Ace Williams (1917–1999), American baseball pitcher
A. D. Williams (1933–2019), American football player
Adam Williams (actor) (1922–2006), American film and television actor
Adam Williams (basketball) (born 1983), British basketball player
Adele Williams (1868–1952), American artist
Adele Fay Williams (1859–1937), American artist and newspaper writer
Adim Williams, Nigerian film director
Ady Williams (born 1971), Welsh international footballer and football manager
Aeneas Williams (born 1968), American football player
Akintola Williams (born 1919), Nigerian accountant
Al Williams (1930s pitcher) (1914–1969), American baseball pitcher
Al Williams (basketball) (1948–2007), American basketball player
Alain Williams (born 1954), British Olympic sprint canoer
Alaina Williams (born 1990), American trampolinist
Alberta Williams King (1904–1974), American; mother of Martin Luther King Jr.
Aled Williams (footballer) (1933–2005), Welsh footballer
Alejandro Williams (born 1969), politician from the Dominican Republic
Ali Williams (born 1981), New Zealand rugby union international
Allan Williams (politician) (1922–2011), Attorney-General of British Columbia, 1979–1983
Allan Williams (1930–2016), businessman, booking agent to The Beatles
Alun Williams (1920–1992), Welsh radio presenter
Alvin Williams (American football) (born 1965), American football player
Alvin Williams (born 1974), American basketball player
Alwyn Williams (bishop) (1888–1968), Bishop of Durham, 1939–52, and Bishop of Winchester, 1952–61
Alwyn Williams (geologist) (1921–2004), Welsh geologist
Alyson Williams (born 1962), American R&B singer
Amanda Williams (judge) (born 1946), American Superior Court Judge
Amanda Kyle Williams (1957–2018), American crime writer
Amy Williams (tennis) (1872–1969), American tennis player
Amy Williams (born 1982), English skeleton racer and Olympic gold medalist
Amy Williams (rugby union) (born 1986), New Zealand rugby union player
Anastasia P. Williams (born 1957), American politician in Rhode Island
Anne Williams-Isom (born 1967), American government official, academic, lawyer, and former nonprofit executive 
Andrae Williams (born 1983), Bahamian Olympic sprint athlete
Andre Williams (musician) (born Zephire Andre Williams 1936–2019), American R&B and rock and roll musician
Andre Williams (American football) (born 1992), American football running back
Angel Kyodo Williams (born 1969), American writer and Buddhist priest
Angel Williams (born 1981), Canadian female pro wrestler
Anita Álvarez de Williams (born 1931), American anthropologist, photographer and historian
Annabelle Williams (born 1988), Australian Paralympic swimmer
Annette Polly Williams (1937–2014), American politician
Annie Williams (suffragette) (c. 1860–1943), British women's rights activist
Anson Williams (born 1949), American actor
Antonio Williams (Medal of Honor) (1825–1908), American Medal of Honor recipient
Archibald Williams (judge) (1801–1863), United States federal judge
Archibald Hunter Arrington Williams (1842–1895), Democratic U.S. Congressman from North Carolina
Archie Williams (1915–1993), American athlete
Archie Williams (footballer) (1927–1985), Scottish footballer
Arena Williams (born 1990), New Zealand politician
Aric Williams (born 1982), American footballer
Arlene Williams (1946–2017), American TV chef
Armstrong Williams (born 1959), American political columnist
A. S. Williams (born 1970), English cricketer
Athol Williams (born 1970), South African poet and social philosopher
Audrey Williams (1923–1975), American country musician
Audrey Williams (archaeologist) (1902–1978), Welsh archaeologist
Augustine Podmore Williams (1852–1916), English mariner
Austin Williams (born 1996), American actor
Avondale Williams (born 1977), British Virgin Islands footballer and manager
Avril Williams (born 1961), South African rugby union international 
Axel Williams (born 1983), Tahitian international footballer

B
Barrie Williams (born 1955), English football manager
Bart Williams (actor) (1949–2015), American character actor and documentary filmmaker
Bart Williams (rugby league), rugby league player
Barton Williams (born 1956), American Olympic-grade hurdler
Beatrice Williams née Kerr (1887–1971), Australian swimmer and diver
Beau Williams (born 1950), American gospel singer
Becky Williams, American Union activist
Bedwyr Williams (born 1974), Welsh artist
Benny Williams (footballer) (born 1951), English former footballer
Bergen Williams (born 1959), American actress
Bernice Williams, American songwriter
Bert Williams (1874–1922), American comedian and entertainer
Bert Williams (footballer, born 1905) (1905–1974), Welsh professional footballer
Bert Williams (footballer, born 1920) (1920–2014), English international goalkeeper
Bertie Williams (1907–1968), Welsh football international
Beryl Alice Evans née Williams (1922–2006), Australian politician
Betty Williams (Nobel laureate) (1943–2020), Nobel Peace Prize recipient from Northern Ireland
Betty Williams (politician) (born 1944), Welsh Labour Party politician and MP
Betty Smith Williams, American nurse
Beverly Williams (born 1947), American TV news anchor
Bianca Williams (born 1993), British sprint athlete
Bisa Williams (born 1954), American diplomat, Deputy Assistant Secretary, Bureau of African Affairs
Blake Williams (basketball) (1924–2003), American basketball player
Blake Williams (born 1985), Australian motorsports competitor
Bo Williams (1938–2022), American politician
Boo Williams (born 1978), American footballer
Boris Williams (born 1957), English drummer (The Cure)
Boyce Courtney Williams (born 1954), American educator
Brackette Williams, American anthropologist
Brady Williams (born 1979), American baseball player and manager
Brandi Williams (born 1982), American actress and singer-songwriter
Brenda Williams (born 1949), South African cricketer
Brendan Williams (politician) (born 1968), American politician in Washington State
Brendan Williams (rugby union) (born 1978), Australian rugby union footballer
Brennan Williams (born 1991), American footballer and professional wrestler better known by his ring names Dio Maddin and Mace
Brent Williams (American football) (born 1964), NFL footballer of the 1980s and 1990s
Brent Williams (Australian footballer) (born 1978), Australian rules footballer for Adelaide
Brinley Williams (1895–1987), Welsh rugby union and rugby league international
Briony Williams, Australian actress
Britain J. Williams, American computer scientist
Brock Williams (born 1979), American football cornerback
Brooke Williams (born 1984), New Zealand actress
Brooks Williams (born 1958), American guitarist and singer-songwriter
Bryce Williams (rugby union) (born 1990), New Zealand rugby union footballer
Bryce Williams (American football) (born 1993), American football player
Bryn Williams (born 1977), Welsh chef
Brynle Williams (1949–2011), Welsh politician
Brynmor Williams (born 1951), Welsh rugby union international and British Lion & rugby league international
Buck Williams (born 1960), American basketball player
Buddug Williams, Welsh actress
Buddy Williams (country musician) (1918–1986), Australian country musician, singer and songwriter
Buddy Williams (jazz drummer) (born 1952), American jazz drummer
Buffy-Lynne Williams (born 1977), Canadian rower
Butch Williams (born 1952), American ice hockey player
Buzz Williams (born 1972), American basketball coach
Byron Williams (American football) (born 1960), American football wide receiver
Byron Williams (shooter) (born 1965), American responsible for the 2010 shootout with California Highway Patrol officers in Oakland

C

C. J. Williams (born 1990), American basketball player in the Israeli Basketball Premier League
Cadillac Williams (born 1982), American footballer
Cal Williams, Australian musician, founder member of Yothu Yindi
Caleb Williams (born 2002), American football player
Calvin Williams (born 1967), American football player
Cameron Williams (born 1963), Australian journalist
Camilla Williams (1919–2012), American operatic soprano
Cara Williams (1925–2021), American actress
Carleigh Williams (born 1992), American soccer player
Carol Williams (disco musician), American disco musician
Carol Williams (politician) (born 1949), majority leader of the Montana State Senate
Carol Williams (organist) (born 1962), American organist and composer
Caroline Williams (born 1957), American actress
Caroline Randall Williams (born 1987), American writer
Carroll Williams (1916–1991), American entomologist
Carroll Williams (Canadian football), American player of gridiron football
Carson Williams (electrical engineer), American electrical engineer
Carwyn Williams (born 1965), Welsh surfer
Cary Williams (born 1984), American football cornerback
Casey Kopua née Williams (born 1985), New Zealand netball international
Cathy Williams, Trinidad-born British novelist
Cathay Williams (1844–1892), African–American female who posed as a man and enlisted in the US Army
Cecil Williams (pastor) (born 1929), American pastor, community leader and author
Cecil Williams (anti-apartheid activist) (1909–1979), English-South African theatre director and anti-apartheid activist
Cedric Williams (1913–1999), British cinematographer
Charley Williams (born 1928), American boxer
Charlotte Williams-Wynn (aristocrat) (c. 1754–1830), British aristocrat, daughter of the P.M. George Grenville
Charlotte Williams-Wynn (diarist) (1807–1869), her granddaughter, British letter-writer and diarist
Charonda Williams (born 1987), American sprint athlete
Chavis Williams (born 1989), American football linebacker
Chaz Williams (born 1991), American basketball player
Chester Sidney Williams (1907–1992), American educator and author
Chester Williams (1970–2019), South African rugby union international
Chester Williams (police officer) (born 1973), Belizean police officer
Cheswin Williams (born 1987), South African rugby union footballer
Chino 'Fats' Williams (1933–2000), American actor
Christina Marie Williams (1985–1998), Filipino–American murder victim
Christine Williams (model) (1945–2017), English model and actress
Christine Williams (nutritionist), British professor of nutrition
Christy Williams (born 1980), Canadian motorcycle trials rider
Chuckie Williams (born 1953), American basketball player
Ciaran Williams (born 1987), British Olympic handball player
Cindy Williams (1947–2023), American actress
Cindy Williams (journalist) (born 1964), American journalist
C. K. Williams (1936–2015), American poet, critic and translator
Claire Williams (motorsport) (born 1976), deputy team principal of the Williams Formula One racing team
Claire Williams (athlete) (born 1987), Welsh Paralympian athlete
Clara Williams (1888–1928), American actress
Clara Belle Williams (1885–1994), first African-American graduate of New Mexico State University
Clark Williams (1870–1946), American banker and New York State Comptroller 1909–1910
Clark Williams (politician) (1942–2020), American politician
Claudia Williams (tennis) (born 1996), New Zealand tennis player
Claudia Williams (artist) (born 1933), British artist
Clayton Williams Jr. (1931–2020), American oilman; Republican gubernatorial nominee in Texas, 1990
Cliff Williams (rugby player) (1898–1930), Welsh rugby union international
Cliff Williams (born 1949), English bassist for the Australian hard rock band AC/DC
Clive Williams (professor) (born 1945), British-born Australian Military Intelligence Officer and academic
Clive Williams (rugby union) (born 1948), Welsh international rugby union player and British Lion
Clyde Williams (Missouri politician) (1873–1954), U.S. Representative from Missouri
Clyde Williams (American football) (1879–1938), American football player, coach, and administrator
Clyde Williams (New York politician)
Cole Williams (born 1981), American actor
Colleen Williams (born 1955), American news anchor
Colleen Williams (soccer) (born 1991), American soccer player
Conrad Williams (athlete) (born 1982), British 400m athlete
Constance H. Williams (born 1944), American politician in Pennsylvania
Cora Lenore Williams (1865–1937), American educator and author
Cory T. Williams, American attorney and Democratic politician in Oklahoma
Cory Williams (born 1981), YouTube personality also known as "Mr. Safety"
Courtney Carl Williams (born 1991), Vincentian Olympic sprinter
Cress Williams (born 1970), German-born American actor
Cunnie Williams (born 1963), American R&B singer
Curtley Williams (born 1990), English footballer
Cy Williams (1887–1974), American baseball player
Cy Williams (American football) (1903–1965), American football player
Cynda Williams (born 1966), American actress
Cyndi Williams, American voice actress
Cyril Williams (1921–1980), English footballer and manager
Cyrus J. Williams, film producer

D
Dafydd Williams (born 1954), Canadian astronaut
Daley Williams (born 1986), English rugby league footballer and Jamaican international
Dallas Williams (born 1958), American baseball outfielder and coach
Damarion Williams (born 1998), American football player
Damian Williams (wide receiver) (born 1988), American football wide receiver
Damien Williams (running back) (born 1992), American football running back
Damion Williams (born 1981), Jamaican international footballer
Damon Williams (born 1973), American basketball player
Damond L. Williams (born 1980), American basketball player
Dana Williams (baseball) (born 1963), American baseball player
Danielle Williams (softball), American softball player
Dar Williams (born 1967), American pop–folk singer–songwriter
Darious Williams (born 1993), American football player
Darnell Williams (born 1955), British actor
Darrel Williams (born 1995), American footballer
Darren Williams (Australian rules footballer) (born 1960), Australian rules footballer with Essendon
Darren Williams (author) (born 1967), Australian novelist
Darren Williams (born 1977), English soccer player
Darrent Williams (1982–2007), American football player
Darrin Williams, American politician from Arkansas
Darwyn Williams (born 1960), American businessman
Das Williams (born 1974), American politician
David Henry Williams (1819–1891), American railroad surveyor, civil engineer, writer and volunteer army officer
David Hiram Williams (1812–1848), Welsh geological surveyor 
Davida Williams (born 1986), American actress, singer and photographer
Davina Williams (born 1985), Australian Olympic freestyle skier
Davon Williams (born 1972), Montserratian cricketer
Dawn Williams (born 1973), Olympic middle-distance runner for Dominica
Dawn Monique Williams (born 1978), American theatre director
DeAngelo Williams (born 1983), American footballer
Debbie Williams (born c.1956), American teacher and parachute incident survivor
Del Williams (1945–1984), American football offensive guard
Delaney Williams (born 1962), American actor
Delano Williams (born 1993), sprinter from the Turks and Caicos Islands who represents Great Britain
Deleta Williams (born 1935), American politician from Missouri
Delores Williams (1937–2022), American theologian
Delvin Williams (born 1951), American footballer
Delwyn Williams (born 1938), British Conservative politician
Demetrius Williams (born 1983), American football wide receiver
Demorrio Williams (born 1980), American football linebacker
Deniece Williams (born 1950), American singer-songwriter
Denny Williams (1896–1929), American baseball player
Denzil Williams (born 1938), Welsh rugby union international
Deron Williams (born 1984), NBA basketball player
Derrick Williams (American football) (born 1986), American football wide receiver
Derrick Williams (basketball) (born 1991), American basketball forward
Derrick Williams (footballer) (born 1993), German-born Irish association footballer
Derwin Williams (born 1961), American footballer
Desai Williams (1959–2022), St. Kitts and Nevis born Canadian Olympic sprinter
Desi Williams (fl.2004), English rugby league footballer
Dessima Williams, Grenadian diplomat
Destiny Williams (born 1991), American basketball player
Deunta Williams (born 1987), American football defensive back
DeWitt Williams (1919–2016), American politician in South Carolina
Dexter Williams (born 1997), American football player
D'haquille Williams (born 1993), American football wide receiver
Diana Williams (born 1958), American television journalist
Diane Williams (author) (born 1946), American writer
Diane Williams (athlete) (born 1960), American sprinter
Diane Wray Williams (born 1938), American politician, teacher, and businesswoman
Dib Williams (1910–1992), American Major League Baseball player in the 1930s
Dicoy Williams (born 1996), Jamaican international footballer
Dillwyn Williams (born 1929), British medical scientist
Dino Williams (born 1990), Jamaican international footballer
Dioh Williams (born 1984), Liberian international footballer
Dion Williams (1869–1952), American Marine Corps officer
Doc Williams (racing driver) (1912–1982), American racecar driver
Doc Williams (singer) (1914–2011), American country music bandleader and vocalist
Dokie Williams (born 1960), American football wide receiver
Dolly Williams, American businesswoman
Domanick Williams (born 1980), American football running back
Dominique Williams (born 1990), American football running back
Donna Williams (born 1963), Australian writer, artist, singer-songwriter and screenwriter
Donnie Williams (born 1983), American singer-songwriter
Donnie Williams (American football) (born 1948), American football player
Donte Williams (born 1982), American football coach
Dootsie Williams (Walter Williams, 1911–1991), American record executive and producer
Dorian Williams (American football) (born 2001), American football player
Dorothy Williams (activist) (1928–2011), South African anti-apartheid activist
Duane Williams (1861–1912), American lawyer fundamental in the foundation of the International Tennis Federation
Dub Williams (1927–2014), American politician
Duck Williams (born 1956), American basketball player for the New Orleans Jazz
Dudley Williams (biochemist) (1937–2010), British biochemist 
Dudley Williams (judge) (1889–1963), Australian judge
Dudley Williams (MP) (1908–1987), British aeronautical engineer and Conservative Party politician
Dudley Williams (physicist) (1912–2004), president of the Optical Society of America in 1979
Duke Williams (American football) (born 1990), American football safety
Duke Williams, American musician
Duncan Williams (born 1986), Irish rugby union footballer for Munster
Duvall Williams, US Navy rear admiral
Dyana Williams (born 1953), American radio presenter and journalist
Dyfri Williams (born 1952), British classical archaeologist

E
E. Stewart Williams (1909–2005), American architect
Earle Williams (1880–1927), silent film actor
Earnest Williams (born 1949), American politician in Georgia
Ederyn Williams (born 1946), British academic and businessman
Edlorn Williams, Antigua and Barbudan international footballer
Edson Williams (born 1966), visual effects supervisor
Eduardo Williams (born 1987), Argentine film director
Edy Williams (born 1942), American actress
Eifion Williams (born 1975), Welsh footballer
Eirian Williams (born 1955), Welsh snooker referee
Eka Esu Williams (born 1950), Nigerian immunologist and activist
Elijah Williams (chess player) (1809–1854), British chess player
Elijah Williams (American football) (born 1975), American footballer
Elisha Williams (1694–1755), Congregational minister, legislator, soldier, jurist, and rector of Yale
Elisha Williams (basketball) (born 1978), Canadian Paralympic wheelchair basketball player
Eliud Williams (born 1948), President of Dominica 2012–2013
Elizabeth Williams (artist), American illustrator, courtroom artist and author
Ellen D. Williams, American actress
Ellen D. Williams (chemist) (born 1953), American chemist
Ellery Williams (1926–2017), American footballer
Elliot Williams (born 1989), American basketball player
Ellis E. Williams (born 1951), American TV actor and comedian
Elmer Williams (born 1964), Puerto Rican Olympic long jumper
Elmo Williams (1913–2015), American film and TV editor, producer, director and executive
Elton Williams (born 1973), Montserratian international footballer
Emily Williams (architect) (1869–1942), American architect
Emily Williams (born 1984), New Zealand–born Australian singer–songwriter
Emlyn Williams (1905–1987), Welsh actor and dramatist
Emma Vyssotsky (1894–1975), née Williams, American astronomer
Emma Kennedy (born 1967), British comedian
Emma Williams (actress) (born 1983), British actress who starred in The Parole Officer
Emma Williams (gymnast) (born 1983), British gymnast who competed at the 2000 Summer Olympics
Emmitt Williams (born 1998), American basketball player
Emory Williams (1911–2014), a Chicago businessman
Enda Williams (born 1985), Irish Gaelic footballer
Envis Williams (born 1962), West Indian cricketer from Tobago
Ephraim S. Williams (1802–1890), American politician
Erika Monroe Williams, American news anchor and TV host
Esther Williams (1921–2013), American movie star and competitive swimmer
Evelyn Williams (politician), American politician in New Jersey
Evelyn Williams (artist) (1929–2012), British artist

F
Faith M. Williams (1893–1958), American economist
Fara Williams (born 1984), English football international
Fenton Williams, American production designer and video director
Finty Williams (born 1972), English actress
Floyd Williams (born 1939), American mathematician
Fly Williams (born 1953), American basketball player
Fos Williams (1922–2001), Australian rules footballer and coach from South Australia
Foy Williams (born 1973), Jamaican-born Canadian Olympic sprinter
Frances Williams (1904–1978), Welsh-born American composer and conductor
Franklin Williams (diplomat) (1928–1990), lawyer and civil rights leader in the United States
Franklin Delano Williams (1947–1993), American Gospel music singer
Frederic Calland Williams (1911–1977), English electrical engineer
Frederic Newton Williams (1862–1923), English physician and botanist
Frederic Wanklyn Williams (1854–1940), New Zealand business proprietor, director and community leader
Frederica Williams (born 1958), American health care executive
Freedom Williams (born 1966), American hip-hop and dance music performer
Freeman Williams (1956–2022), American basketball player

G
G. Mennen Williams (1911–1988), Democratic governor of Michigan
Gabby Williams (born 1996), American basketball player
Gabriel I. H. Williams, Liberian journalist
Gabrielle Williams (born 1982), Australian politician
Gail Williams, director of The WELL
Gale R. Williams (1922–2007), American politician
Galmo Williams, Premier of the Turks and Caicos Islands (2009)
Gardner F. Williams (1842–1922), American mining engineer and author
Garrett Williams (born 2001), American football player
Garth Williams (1912–1996), American artist
Gavin Williams (rugby union) (born 1979), New Zealand rugby player
Gavin Williams (footballer) (born 1980), Welsh footballer
Geisha Williams (born 1961/62), American businesswoman
Gemara Williams (born 1983), American and Canadian football player
Gene Williams (basketball) (born 1947), American basketball player
Gene Williams (American football) (born 1968), US American football player
Genelle Williams (born 1984), Canadian actress
Geoffrey Williams (born 1963), English singer-songwriter
Georgia Williams (born 1993), New Zealand racing cyclist
Geraint Williams (born 1962), Welsh footballer and manager
Gerard Williams (American football) (born 1952), American football player
Gerard Williams (footballer) (born 1988), Saint Kitts and Nevis footballer
 Germaine Williams (born 1974), Jamaican-American rapper and actor better known as Canibus
Gerry Williams (footballer) (1877–1901), Australian footballer
Gilly Williams (1719–1805), English official, wit and letter writer
Ginger Williams (singer) (born 1956), Jamaican-born British singer
Gizmo Williams (Henry L. Williams, born 1962), American football player
Glanmor Williams (1920–2005), Welsh historian
Glen Morgan Williams (1920–2012), United States federal judge
Glen Williams (basketball) (1954–2017), American basketball player
Glenn Williams (born 1977), Australian baseball player
Glenn Williams (sound engineer), American sound engineer
Glyn Williams (footballer) (1918–2011), Welsh footballer
Glyndwr Williams (1932–2022), professor of history at Queen Mary, University of London
Glynn Williams (born 1939), British sculptor
Gord Williams (born 1960), Canadian ice hockey player
Grace Williams (1906–1977), Welsh composer
Greedy Williams (born 1997), American football player
Gregg Williams (born 1958), American football coach
Gregory Alan Williams (born 1956), American actor and author
Gregory H. Williams, American academic
Greta Williams, English opera singer
Griff Williams (born 1966), American artist
Guinn Williams (Texas politician) (1871–1948), American state senator and congressman from Texas
Guinn "Big Boy" Williams (1899–1962), American actor
Gwendoline Williams (1922–2013), British novelist
Gwilym Williams (1913–1990), Anglican Archbishop of Wales 1971–1982
Gwyn Williams (rugby), Welsh rugby player
Gwyn A. Williams (1925–1995), Welsh historian
Gwyn Williams (football manager), Leeds United's technical director and manager
Gwyneth Williams (born 1953), controller of BBC Radio 4
Gwynfor Williams (born 1956), Welsh rugby footballer
Gwynne Williams (born 1937), Welsh poet and translator

H
H. Williams (Worcestershire cricketer), English cricketer
H. R. Williams, American writer
Hal Williams (born 1938), American actor
Hardy Williams (1931–2010), American politician
Harland Williams (born 1962), Canadian-American comedian, actor, and radio personality
Harper Williams (born 1971), American basketball player
Harrison Williams (entrepreneur) (1873–1953), American entrepreneur who made millions in public utilities
Harrison A. Williams (1919–2001), U.S. Senator from New Jersey
Harry H. Williams (1879–1922), American composer, lyricist, and publisher of popular music
Hartley Williams (1843–1929), judge in Victoria, Australia, not related to the priest
Hartley Williams (clergyman) (1844–1927), Anglican priest who founded a private school in Mount Gambier, South Australia
Harwood Williams (born 1970), Kittitian cricketer
Hayley Williams (born 1988), American lead singer of the band Paramore
Hayley J Williams, English actress
Hayward Williams, American singer-songwriter
Heathcote Williams (1941–2017), English poet, actor and dramatist
Heathcote Williams (cricket administrator) (1859–1931), New Zealand cricket administrator
Heimar Williams (born 1991), South African rugby union player
Helema Williams (born 1991), Cook Islander Olympic sailor
Henria Leech Williams (1867 –1911), British suffragette
Henrik Williams, Swedish historian and linguist
Herb Williams (born 1958), American basketball player
Herbie Williams (born 1940), Welsh international footballer
Hershel W. Williams (1923–2022), US Marine; Medal of Honor recipient
Hilda May Williams (1899–1972), American nurse
Hillary Williams (born 1988), American grappler and Brazilian jiu–jitsu practitioner
Hiram D. Williams (1917–2003), painter and University of Florida professor
Holly Williams (born 1981), American country music artist; granddaughter of Hank Williams
Horace Williams (1900–1960), Welsh professional football player and manager
Horatio Burt Williams (1877–1955), American electrophysiologist
Horton Williams (born 1933), Australian judge
Hosea Williams (1926–2000), American civil rights leader 
Howard Williams (humanitarian) (1837–1931), author of The Ethics of Diet
Howie Williams (basketball) (1927–2004), American basketball player
Howie Williams (born 1936), American football safety
Hugo Williams (born 1942), British poet, journalist and travel writer
Hype Williams (born 1970), American music video and film director
Hywel Williams (born 1953), Welsh politician and Plaid Cymru MP

I
Idris Williams (1834–1894), Welsh Liberal politician
Ieuan Williams (1909–1964), Welsh cricketer
Ieuan Rhys Williams (1909–1973), Welsh actor
Ifor Williams (1881–1965), Welsh scholar of Old Welsh
Ike Williams (1923–1994), American boxer
Illtyd Williams (fl. 1930s), Welsh rugby league footballer for Castleford
Iñaki Williams (born 1994), Spanish footballer
Iolo Williams (born 1962), Welsh nature observer and TV presenter
Iris Williams (born 1944), Welsh singer
Irv Williams (1919–2019), American jazz saxophonist and composer
Isadora Williams (born 1996), American-Brazilian Olympic figure skater
Isiah Williams (born 1987), American football quarterback
Isiah Williams (basketball), American basketball player
Ivor Williams (1908–1982), Welsh artist
Ivory Williams (born 1985), American sprinter
Ivy Williams (1877–1966), English lawyer; first woman to be called to the bar
Izaac Williams (born 1989), New Zealand basketball player

J
J. Williams (singer) (born 1986), New Zealand R&B singer
J. Williams (cinematographer) (1948–2005), Indian cinematographer in Malayalam movies
J. Allen Williams (born 1960), American animator
J. D. Williams (born 1978), American actor
J. H. Williams III (born 1965), American comic book writer and artist
J. Henry Williams (1831–1889), British born Episcopal minister and Virginia politician
J. J. Williams (1948–2020), Welsh rugby union international and British Lion
J. Lloyd Williams (1854–1945), Welsh botanist, author, and musician
J. Mark G. Williams, British psychologist
J. P. R. Williams (born 1949), Welsh rugby union international and British Lion
J. Terry Williams (1930–2015), film editor
Jabara Williams (born 1989), American footballer
Jabo Williams (c.1895–1953 or 1954), American boogie-woogie and blues pianist and songwriter
Jackson Williams (born 1986), American baseball player
Jacob Williams (born 1991), American wheelchair basketball player
Jacques Williams (born 1981), English footballer
Jacquian Williams (born 1988), American basketball player
Jade Williams (born 1988), British pop singer
Jalen Williams (born 2001), American basketball player
Jamal Williams (born 1976), American footballer
Jamaal Williams (born 1995), American football player
Jamar Williams (born 1984), US American and Canadian football player
Jamel Williams (born 1973), American footballer
Jamie Williams (American football) (born 1960), former NFL tight end
 Jamie Williams, (born 1976), American musician known as Jamie Pressnall
Jamye Coleman Williams (1918-2022), American social activist
Jan Williams (born 1939), American musician, conductor and composer
Jan-Michael Williams (born 1984), Trinidad and Tobago international footballer 
Janet Williams (basketball) (born 1953), Australian basketball player
Janet Williams (soprano), American operatic soprano and voice teacher
Janice Savin Williams, Jamaican-born American businesswoman
JaQuitta Williams, American TV journalist
Jarrett Williams (born 1984), American comic book creator
Jarvis Williams (wide receiver) (born 1987), American football player
Javarris Williams (born 1986), American football running back
Javonte Williams (born 2000), American football player
Jawad Williams (born 1983), American basketball player
Jayson Williams (born 1968), American basketball player
Jean Williams (born 19??), British sports historian and author
Jean E. Williams (1876–1965), British composer
Jed Williams (1952–2003), Welsh jazz journalist
Jeenathan Williams (born 1999), American basketball player
Jenni Williams (born 1962), Zimbabwean human rights activist; founder of 'Women of Zimbabwe Arise (WOZA)
Jenny Williams (born 1939), Irish author and academic
Jenny Williams (sportsperson) (born 1957), Australian sportswoman
Jermaine Williams (American football) (born 1973), American football running back
Jermaine Williams (born 1982), American actor and dancer
Jerome Williams (basketball) (born 1973), basketball player
Jerome Williams (baseball) (born 1981), Major League Baseball player
Jerrol Williams (born 1967), American football linebacker
Jessica Williams (actress) (born 1989), American actress, comedian, and correspondent
Jessica Williams (musician) (1948–2022), American pianist and composer
Jett Williams (born 1953), American country music performer
Jewell Williams (born 1957), American politician in Pennsylvania
Jez Williams (born 1970), English guitarist and songwriter
Jerry Michael Williams (1969–2000), American male murder victim
Jo Williams (born 1948), British civil servant
Joan C. Williams (born 1952), American psychologist and academic 
JoBeth Williams (born 1948), American actress
Jodie Williams (born 1993), British sprinter
Joejuan Williams (born 1997), American football player
Joey Williams (1902–1978), English footballer
Josiah B. Williams (1810–1883), New York politician
Joss Williams, special effects supervisor
Joy Williams (Australian writer) (1942–2006), Australian author of poetry
Joy Williams (singer), Christian music singer and songwriter
Joy Williams (American writer), American author of fiction
Juan Williams (born 1954), Panamanian–born American journalist
Jules Williams (born 1968), British writer, director and producer
Julia Williams (abolitionist) (1811–1870), American abolitionist
Julia Williams (academic), British paramedic science academic
Julian Williams (American football) (born 1990), American football wide receiver
Julian Williams (boxer) (born 1990), American boxer
Julie Williams (scientist) (born c.1957), Chief Scientific Officer for Wales
Julius Penson Williams (born 1954), American composer and conductor
Julius Williams (born 1986), American Arena footballer
Jumaane Williams (born 1976), American politician in New York City
Junior Williams (born 1987), Grenadian international footballer
Justin Williams (born 1981), Canadian ice hockey player
Justin Williams (basketball) (born 1985), American basketball player
Justin Williams (baseball) (born 1995), American baseball player

K
K. D. Williams (born 1973), American footballer
Kaa Williams, New Zealand TV presenter
Kamiko Williams (born 1991), American basketball player
Karen Williams (soprano), American concert and opera soprano
Karen Hastie Williams (1944–2021), American lawyer and company director
Karen J. Williams (1951–2013), American judge of the US Court of Appeals of the Fourth Circuit
Karen Lynn Williams (born 1952), American writer of children's literature
Karl Williams (born 1971), American football player
Karlos Williams (born 1993), American football player
Karyn Williams (born 1979), American Christian musician
Kasen Williams (born 1992), American football wide receiver
Kat Williams (born 1964), American blues singer
 Kate Williams (1875–1946), stage name Vulcana, Welsh strongwoman
Kate Williams (historian) (born 1978), British author, historian and TV presenter
Kate Williams (actress) (born 1941), English actress
Kath Williams (1895–1975), Australian women's activist
Katharine Williams (judge), Australian judge
Kathleen M. Williams (born 1956), American judge
Kathleen Williams (politician) (born 1963), American politician
Kathryn Williams (born 1974), an English singer-songwriter
Katie Williams (footballer) (born 1984), Welsh international footballer
Katt Williams (born 1971), American comedian, actor, rapper and singer
Kayla Williams (author) (born 1976), U.S. Army linguist
Kayla Williams (gymnast) (born 1993), American gymnast
Keiland Williams (born 1986), American football running back
Keller Williams (born 1969), American musician
Kelli Williams (born 1970), American actress
Kelli Williams (musician) (born 1978), American gospel musician
Kellie Shanygne Williams (born 1976), American actress
Kelly Williams (born 1982), Filipino–American basketball player
Kelly Glenn Williams, American filmmaker
Kelvin Williams (born 1959), Trinidad and Tobago cricketer and national coach
Kendal Williams (born 1995), American sprinter
Kendall Williams (born 1991), American basketball player
Kenji Williams, American filmmaker and musician
Kenroy Williams (born 1984), Barbadian cricketer for the West Indies 
Keron Williams (born 1984), Jamaican-born player of Canadian football
Kerry Williams, American voice actress
Kerwynn Williams (born 1991), American football running back
Keston Williams (born 1988), Trinidad and Tobago international footballer
Kid Williams (1893–1963), Danish boxer; bantamweight world champion
Kiely Williams (born 1986), American singer/actress, Member of girl groups The Cheetah Girls and 3LW
Kimo Williams (born 1950), American composer, musician and professor
Kip Williams (born 1968), American director, producer and screenwriter
Kipling Williams, American psychology academic
Kipper Williams (born 1951), British cartoonist
Kirk Williams (born 1986), American basketball player
Kirsty Williams (born 1971), Welsh politician, leader of the Welsh Liberal Democrats
Kirsty Williams (drama), British radio drama director and producer
Kit Williams (born 1946), English artist, illustrator and author
Kiyan Williams (born 1991) American multidisciplinary artist   
Korey Williams (born 1987), American football player
Korto Reeves Williams, Liberian activist
Kris Williams (filmmaker) (born 1980), American filmmaker and high school teacher
K'Waun Williams (born 1991), American football player
Kylie Williams (born 1983), American beauty queen
Kyren Williams (born 2000), American football player

L
L. D. Williams (born 1988), American basketball player
Lamanzer Williams (born 1974), American football defensive end
Lance Williams (graphics researcher) (1949–2017), American graphics researcher
Lance Williams (basketball) (born 1980), American basketball player
LaQuan Williams (born 1988), American football wide receiver
Laron Williams (1949–1985), American serial killer
Latavious Williams (born 1989), American basketball player
LaToy Williams (born 1988), Bahamian sprinter
Latoya Williams (born 1987), American basketball player
Lauryn Williams (born 1983), Trinidadian-born American Olympic sprinter and bobsleigh athlete
Layton Williams (born 1994), English stage and TV actor
Lefty Williams (born 1974), American guitarist
Leila Williams (born 1937), British beauty queen and TV presenter (Blue Peter 1958–62)
Leighton Williams (born 1977), Welsh chess master
Len Williams (speedway rider) (1921–2007), English international speedway rider
Len Williams (Canadian football) (born 1971), Canadian football quarterback
Lenae Williams (born 1979), American basketball player
Lenny Williams (born 1945), American singer
Lenny Williams (Canadian football) (born 1981), US Canadian footballer
Leona Williams (born 1943), American country music singer
Leroy Williams (1941–2022), American jazz drummer
Lester Williams (musician) (1920–1990), American blues guitarist, singer and songwriter
Lontrell Williams (born 1999), American rapper known as Pooh Shiesty
Lester Williams (1959–2017), American football defensive tackle
Levi Williams (1794–1860), Illinois militia member and Baptist minister
Levron Williams (born 1979), US American and Canadian footballer
Lew Williams (1934–2019), American rockabilly singer and songwriter
Lia Williams (born 1964), English actress
Liam Williams (rugby player) (born 1991), Welsh rugby union player
Liam Williams (boxer) (born 1992), Welsh boxer 
Lily Williams (cyclist) (born 1994), American professional racing cyclist
Lincoln Williams (born 1993), Australian volleyball player
Lindon Williams (1932–1989), American Democratic Texan politician
Lindsay Williams (born 1946), British Olympic slalom canoeist 
Lisa Williams (poet) (born 1966), American poet
Liz Williams (born 1965), British sci–fi writer
Lizaad Williams (born 1993), South African cricketer
Lizzie Williams (born 1983), Australian racing cyclist
W. Llewelyn Williams (1867–1922), Welsh journalist, lawyer and Liberal politician
Llŷr Williams (born 1976), Welsh pianist
Llywelyn Williams (1911–1965), Welsh Labour party politician
Lon Williams (1890–1978), American author, teacher and lawyer
Lona Williams (born 1966), American TV producer, writer and actress
Lori Williams (born 1946), American actress
Lorraine Williams, American businesswoman
Lottie Williams (1874–1962), American character actress
Lucinda Williams (born 1953), American rock, folk, and country music singer and songwriter
Lucinda Williams (athlete) (born 1937), American runner
Lucy Williams (born 1976), Australian paralympic swimmer
Lucy Gwendolen Williams (1870–1955), British artist
Lukyn Williams (1853–1943), Christian author
Lydia Williams (born 1988), Australian soccer player
Lyle Williams (1942–2008), American politician
Lynda Williams (born 1958), Canadian sci-fi writer and blogger

M
Madeleine Williams (born 1983), Canadian cross-country skier
Madieu Williams (born 1981), American football player
Maggie Williams (born 1954), American management consultant and campaign manager for Hillary Clinton
Maisie Williams (born 1997), English actress
Maiya Williams (born 1962), American author, TV producer and screenwriter
Maizie Williams (born 1951), Montserratian-born British singer
Malinda Williams (born 1976), American actress
Malique Williams (born 1988), Antiguan Olympic swimmer
Mandisa Williams (born 1984), South African rugby union player
Marc Lloyd Williams (born 1973), Welsh footballer
Marc Williams (born 1988), Welsh footballer
Marco Williams, American documentary filmmaker
Margaret Lindsay Williams (1888–1960), Welsh artist 
Margot Williams (botanist), American botanist
Margot Williams, American journalist
Marianne Williams (1793–1879), British pioneering educator in New Zealand
Marilyn Taylor Williams (1954–2009), American politician from Missouri
Mario Williams (born 1985), American football defensive end; Houston Texans, Buffalo Bills
Marion Williams (1927–1994), American gospel singer
Marion Vernese Williams, Barbadian economist, banker, accountant and diplomat
Marjorie Williams (1958–2005), American writer, reporter and columnist
Marley Williams (born 1993), Australian rules footballer
Marmaduke Williams (1772–1850), American politician
Marquez Williams (born 1994), American football player
Marquise Williams (born 1992), American football player
Mars Williams (born 1955), American jazz and rock saxophonist
Marsha Garces Williams (born 1956), American film producer
Marsha Rhea Williams (born 1948), American computer scientist, researcher, and educator.
Marshall Williams (born 1989), Canadian actor, model and musician
Marty Williams (born 1951), American politician in Virginia
Martyn Williams (born 1975), Wales and British Lions international rugby union player
Mason Williams (born 1938), American guitarist, composer, poet and comedy writer
Mason Williams (baseball) (born 1991), American baseball player
Matilda Alice Williams (1875–1973), New Zealand Methodist deaconess
Maxx Williams (born 1994), American football tight end
Medwyn Williams, Welsh vegetable gardener 
Megan Williams (actress) (1956–2000), Australian actress and singer
Megan Williams-Stewart (born 1987), American figure skater
Mekeil Williams (born 1990), Trinidadian international footballer
Melanie Williams (born 1964), British singer
Mentor Williams (1946–2016), American songwriter and producer
Mercy Williams (c.1947–2014), Indian politician
Meritzer Williams (born 1989), Saint Kitts and Nevis sprinter
Merriwether Williams (born 1968), American TV writer
Meshak Williams (born 1991), American footballer
Micah Stephen Williams (born 1991), American actor
Michelle Williams (singer) (born 1980), American singer and actress, member of group Destiny's Child
Michelle Williams (actress) (born 1980), American actress
Midge Williams (1915–1952), American swing and jazz vocalist
Miller Williams (1930–2015), American poet, translator, editor
Milt Williams (born 1945), American basketball point guard
Milton Williams (born 1999), American football player
Mitch Williams (politician) (born 1953), South Australian Liberal politician and farmer
Mitch Williams (baseball) (born 1964), known as "Wild Thing", Major League Baseball pitcher
Mo Williams (born 1982), American basketball player
Moe Williams (born 1974), American football running back
Molly Williams (fl.1818), former slave and first female firefighter in New York
Monk Williams (1945–2003), American football player
Montel Williams (born 1956), American television talk show host
Monty Williams (born 1971), American basketball player and coach
Morris Williams (1809–1874), Welsh clergyman and writer
Morris Meredith Williams (1881–1973), British painter and illustrator
Morris Williams (politician) (1924–1995), Australian politician
Murray Williams (born 1982), New Zealand rugby union footballer and Japan international
Myrna Williams (politician) (1929–2021), American politician in Nevada
Myron B. Williams (c.1817–1884), American politician and lawyer

N
N. D. Williams (born 1942), Guyanese writer
Nancy Williams, New Zealand cricketer 
Nansi Williams, heroine of Aberfan disaster
Nat Williams (born 1956), American law-enforcement officer
Natalie Williams (born 1970), American basketball player
Natasha Williams (actress) (born 1971), Jamaican actress based in Britain
Nate Williams (born 1950), American basketball player
Neal H. Williams (1870–1956), American physicist
Nell Williams (born 1998), English actress
Nelly Williams (born 1980), West Indian cricketer from Trinidad and Tobago
Neville Williams (born c.1940), elder of the Wiradjuri nation in Western New South Wales
Nia Williams (born 1990), American soccer player
Niall Williams (born 1958), Irish author
Sir Nicholas Williams, 1st Baronet (1681–1745), British politician
Nicholas Williams (born 1942), English linguist and expert on the Cornish language
Nicholas Charles Williams (born 1961), English painter and draughtsman
Nicko Williams (born 1989), Grenadian footballer
Nico Williams (born 2002), Spanish soccer player and coach
Nicola Williams (soccer) (born 1982), Australian soccer player and coach
Nikema Williams, US Representative
Nikki Williams (born 1988), South African singer-songwriter
Noel Williams, Northern Irish politician
Norma Williams (1928–2017), New Zealand swimmer
Novlene Williams-Mills (born 1982), Jamaican Olympic 400 metre runner
Nushawn Williams (born 1976), American sex offender

O
Olajide Williams (born 1988), Nigerian footballer
Oliver Williams (cricketer) (born 1983), English cricketer
Olivia Williams (born 1968), British actress
Olly Williams, British artist working as one half of Olly and Suzi
O'Neill Williams (born 1943), American angler and TV presenter
Oren Williams (born 1992), American actor
Orrin J. Williams (1844–1913), American businessman and politician
Orrin T. Williams (1845–1928), American judge and politician
Oritsé Williams (born 1986), English singer-songwriter, dancer and record producer ('JLS')
Osbert Edwin Williams Jr. (1875–1917), pioneer aviator
Oshor Williams (born 1958), English footballer
Otis Williams (born 1941), American singer and member of The Temptations
Owain Williams, Welsh nationalist, convicted bomber–turned–politician

P
P. J. Williams (born 1993), American football cornerback
Palmer Williams Jr. (born 1965), American actor
Pamela Williams, American jazz saxophonist, songwriter, producer and artist
Parker Williams (1873–1958), Welsh–born Canadian politician
Patricia J. Williams (born 1951), American legal scholar
 Patti Williams (born 1955), American wrestler known as Precious
Peggy R. Williams, US/Canadian college president
Pendarvis Williams (born 1991), American basketball player
Penny Williams (1937–2018), American politician in Oklahoma
Percy Williams (sprinter) (1908–1982), Canadian athlete
Percy G. Williams (1857−1923), American vaudeville performer and vaudeville theater owner/manager
Pernal Williams (born 1991), St Lucian international footballer
Pharrell Williams (born 1973), American singer/rapper/producer
Pierre Williams (born 1975), British murderer
Pip Williams (born 1947), British record producer
Pip Williams (author), Australian author, writer of The Dictionary of Lost Words (2020)
Pointer Williams (born 1974), American basketball player
Pooka Williams Jr. (born 1998), American football player
Pop Williams (1874–1959), American baseball player
Pop Williams (American football) (1906–1979), American football player
Porsha Williams (born 1981), American TV personality, model and singer
Poto Williams (born 1961/62), New Zealand politician
Preston Williams (born 1997), American football player

Q
Quentin Williams (1983-2023), American politician
Quincy Williams (born 1996), American football player
Quinnen Williams (born 1997), American football player

R
R. J. Williams (born 1978), American actor, TV host and producer
R. Norris Williams (1891–1968), American tennis player
R. Owen Williams, American education executive
R. Sanders Williams (born 1948), American academic
R. Seth Williams (born 1967), American attorney
R. Stanley Williams (born 1951), American research scientist
Rachel Williams (born 1967), American model
Rachel Williams (footballer) (born 1988), English international footballer
Rachel DeLoache Williams, American writer
Raequan Williams (born 1997), American football player
Rai'shaun Williams, American record producer and songwriter
Randa Williams (born 1962), American heiress
Randal Williams (born 1978), American footballer
Randy Williams (born 1953), American long jumper
Randy Williams (baseball) (born 1975), American baseball player
Raynell Williams (born 1989), American Olympic boxer
Rebecca Williams (born 1988), British actress
Rebecca Chase Williams, American journalist and city mayor
Rebekah Williams (born 1950), Canadian politician in Nunavut
Redaric Williams (born 1981), American actor
Reece Williams (born 1985), Australian rugby league player
Rees Williams (1900–1963), Welsh footballer
Reid Williams, American TV and film director and producer
Renauld Williams (born 1981), US Canadian football linebacker
Reva Williams, American astrophysicist
Rex Williams (born 1933), English snooker and billiards player
Rheinallt Nantlais Williams (1911–1993), Welsh professor of Philosophy of Religion
Rhoda Williams (1930–2006), American actress
Rhodri Williams (born 1968), Welsh sports journalist
Rhodri Williams (born 1993), Welsh rugby union international
Rhydwen Williams (1916–1997), Welsh poet, novelist, editor, minister and television presenter
Rhyne Williams (born 1991), American tennis player
Ricardo Williams (cricketer) (born 1968), English cricketer
Ricardo Williams (athlete) (born 1976), Jamaican Olympic athlete
Ricardo Williams (boxer) (born 1981), American boxer
Rickey Williams Jr. (born 1975/1976), American mayor
Rip Williams (1882–1933), American baseball player
Riquna Williams (born 1990), American basketball player
Rita Williams (born 1976), American basketball player
Robert Wiliams (1926–2015), British inorganic chemist
Robina Williams, English author
Robyn Williams (born 1944), British–born Australian science journalist and broadcaster
Robley C. Williams (1908–1995), American biophysicist
Rodarius Williams (born 1996), American football player
Roderick Williams, opera singer (born 1965), English operatic baritone and composer
Rodwell Williams (born 1956), Belizean lawyer
Roland Williams (born 1975), American football tight end
Roley Williams (1927–1999), Welsh footballer
Rollin Williams (1922–2012), American social work educator
Rolston Williams (born 1965), Antiguan and Barbudan football player and manager
Romario Williams (born 1994), Jamaican footballer
Ronnie Williams (1939–1997), Welsh actor and comedian
Ronnie Williams (American football) (born 1966), American footballer
Ronnie Williams (footballer) (1907–1987), Welsh footballer
Ronwen Williams (born 1992), South African footballer
Roosevelt Williams (1903–1996), American blues pianist
Roosevelt Williams (gridiron football) (born 1978), American football cornerback
Roshumba Williams (born 1968), American model
Ross Williams (computer scientist) (born 1962), Australian computer scientist and entrepreneur
Rowan Williams (born 1950), Archbishop of Canterbury
Rowan Anthony Williams (born 1968), English boxer
Roydell Williams (born 1981), American footballer
Rozz Williams (1963–1998), American rock vocalist
Rubberlegs Williams (Henry Williams, 1907–1962), American blues/jazz singer and dancer
Rubin Williams (born 1976), American boxer
Ruby Williams, American folk artist
Rudy Williams (saxophonist) (1919-1954), American jazz saxophonist
Rudy Williams (footballer) (born 1965), Honduran footballer
Rugg Williams, American actor
Rushbrook Williams (1890–1978), British historian and civil servant
Russ Williams (DJ) (born 1962), English radio DJ
Ruth Williams (1926–2005), American baseball player
Ruth J. Williams, American statistician

S
Sabra Williams, British actress and TV presenter
 Sammie Williams, American trombonist and bandleader known as Big Sam
Sammy Williams (1948–2018), American actor
Sammy Williams (American football) (born 1974), American football offensive lineman
Sandy Williams (1906–1991), American jazz trombonist
Sascha Williams (born 1980), British journalist and news reader
Saul Williams (born 1972), American singer, musician, poet, writer and actor
Scot Williams (born 1972), English actor, writer and producer
Seante Williams (born 1991), American footballer
Serena Williams (born 1981), US pro tennis player and sister of Venus Williams
Shad Williams (born 1971), American baseball pitcher
Shammond Williams (born 1975), American-born Georgian basketball player
Shane Williams (Australian footballer) (born 1959), Australian rules footballer
Shane Williams (born 1977), Welsh rugby union player
Shanice Williams (born 1993), Turks and Caicos Islands beauty pageant titleholder
Shanthi Williams (born 1958), Indian actress
Sharon A. Williams, Canadian lawyer and legal scholar
Sharrie Williams (born 1965), American singer-songwriter
Shaud Williams (born 1980), American footballer
Shawn Williams (lacrosse) (born 1974), Canadian lacrosse player
Shawn Williams (American football) (born 1991), American football player
Shawne Williams (born 1986), US pro basketball player
Sheanon Williams (born 1990), American soccer player
Sheila Williams (born 1956), American editor of Asimov's Science Fiction
Shelden Williams (born 1983), US pro basketball player
Shellene Williams (born 1981), Jamaican track and field sprinter
Shelton Williams, American political scientist
Shericka Williams (born 1985), Jamaican Olympic sprinter
Shermaine Williams (born 1990), Jamaican hurdler
Sherman Williams (boxer) (born 1972), Bahamian boxer
Sherman Williams (American football) (born 1973), American football running back
Shirley Williams (1930–2021), Baroness Williams of Crosby, United Kingdom politician
Shomari Williams (born 1985), Canadian football defensive end
Sian Williams (born 1964), Welsh journalist and TV presenter
Sian Williams (footballer) (born 1968), English footballer and football manager
Sian Williams (rugby player) (born 1990), Welsh professional rugby player
Silas Williams (1888–19??), American footballer and coach
Siobhan Williams, English–Canadian actress
Siraj Williams (born 1984), Liberian Olympic sprinter
Skilly Williams (1890–1959), English footballer
Skip Williams, American games designer
Slim Williams (1881–1974), American frontiersman
Sly Williams (born 1958), American basketball player
Sonia Williams (born 1979), Antiguan sprinter
Sonny Bill Williams (born 1985), New Zealand rugby league and rugby union player
Sophie Williams (born 1991), British fencer
Spin Williams (born 1956), American baseball coach
Stacey Williams (born 1968), American fashion model
Stacey Williams (swimmer) (born 1981), Australian Paralympic swimmer
Stepfret Williams (born 1973), American footballer
Stephanie Williams (dancer), Australian ballet dancer
Stephanie Williams (Miss District of Columbia) (born 1987), Miss District of Columbia, 2010
Stephon Williams (born 1993), American ice hockey goaltender
Stevenson A. Williams (1851–1932), American politician and businessman
Stevie Williams (born 1979), American professional skateboarder
Stewart Williams (born c.1958), English rugby league footballer
Stokley Williams (born 1967), American singer and musician
Sue Williams (artist) (born 1956), Welsh visual artist
Sunita Williams (born 1965), American astronaut
Suzanne Williams, American politician
Syd Williams (1918–1976), Welsh dual code rugby union and rugby league player
Sylvester Williams (American football) (born 1988), American football player
Sylvia Williams (1936–1996), American museum director, curator and art historian

T
T. J. Williams (born 1982), American football tight end
Tad Williams (born 1957), fantasy and science fiction writer
Taffy Williams (1933–1996), Welsh mercenary
Taliesin Williams (1787–1847), Welsh poet and author
Talcott Williams (1849–1928), American journalist and educator
Tamati Williams (born 1984), New Zealand footballer and fashion model
Tameka Williams (born 1989), St Kitts and Nevis sprinter
Tamika Williams (born 1980), American basketball player and coach
Tammy Williams (born 1987), American softball player
Tank Williams (born 1980), American footballer
Tarvis Williams (born 1978), American basketball player
Tasha Williams (athlete) (born 1973), New Zealand Olympic hammer thrower
Taylor John Williams (born June, 1991), American singer-songwriter
Taylor Williams (born July, 1991), American baseball pitcher
Tedd Williams (born 1969), American mixed martial arts fighter
Teddy Williams (American football) (born 1988), American football cornerback
Tennessee Williams (1911–1983), American playwright
Teran Williams (born 1984), Antiguan international footballer
Terrance Williams (born 1989), American football player
Terrell Williams (born 1974), American football player and coach
Terrence Williams (born 1987), American basketball player
Terrick Williams (1860–1936), British painter
Terrie Williams (born 1954), American author
Tex Williams (1917–1985), American  musician
Thelda Williams (born 1941), American politician
Theodore J. Williams (1923–2013), American engineer
Theresa Williams (born 1956), American writer
Tiffany Williams (born 1983), American hurdler
Tiger Williams (born 1954), Canadian ice hockey player
Timmy Williams (born 1981), American actor
Tip Williams (1900–1974), Welsh cricketer
Toby Williams (born 1959), American football player
Toccara Williams, American basketball player
Tod Williams (filmmaker) (born 1968), film director and screenwriter
Toni Williams (1939–2016), New Zealand pop singer
Tonya Lee Williams (born 1958), Canadian actress
Torri Williams (born 1986), American football player
Tourek Williams (born 1991), American football player
Trae Williams (born 1985), American football player
Tramon Williams (born 1983), American football player
Trayveon Williams (born 1997), American football player
Tre Williams, American singer
Treat Williams (born 1951), American actor and children's author
Trent Williams (born 1988), American football player
Trevardo Williams (born 1990), American football player
Trevion Williams (born 2000), American basketball player
Trey Williams (born 1992), American football player
Trill Williams (born 1999), American football player
Troy Williams (born 1994), American football player
Trudi Williams (born 1953), Florida politician
True Williams (1839–1897), American illustrator 
Tucky Williams, American actress
Ty Williams (actor) (born 1966), American actor
Ty Williams (born 1980), Australian rugby league footballer
Tylen Jacob Williams (born 2001), American actor
Tyler James Williams (born 1992), American rapper and actor
Tyrel Jackson Williams (born 1997), American actor
Tyrone Williams (wide receiver) (born 1970), American football player
Tyrone Williams (defensive tackle) (born 1972), American football player
Tyrone Williams (cornerback) (born 1973), American football player
Ty'Son Williams (born 1996), American football player

U
Ulis Williams (born 1941), American Olympic sprinter
Ursula Williams (1896–1979), British Liberal Party politician 
Ursula Moray Williams (1911–2006), English children's author

V
Van Williams (1934–2016), American actor
Van Williams (American football) (born 1959), American football running back 
Van Williams (musician) (born 1966), American drummer
Vanessa Williams (born 1963), American singer, actress, and fashion designer
Vanessa Estelle Williams (born 1963), American actress
Vanessa R. Williams (born 1960), American gospel singer, began recording in the 2000s
Venetia Williams (born 1960), British jockey and racehorse trainer
Venus Williams (born 1980), pro tennis player and sister of Serena Williams
Vera Williams (1927–2015), American children's writer and illustrator
Vern Williams (1930–2006), American bluegrass singer and musician
Vern S. Williams (born 1949), American teacher and National Advisor on Mathematics
Vesta Williams (1957–2011), American singer-songwriter, also recorded as Vesta
Vicki Williams (born 1956), American wrestler
Victor Williams (Canadian Army officer) (1867–1949), Canadian general and Commissioner of the Ontario Provincial Police
Victor Williams (born 1970), American actor
Vin Williams (born 1932), Australian rules footballer
Virgil Williams, American TV writer and producer
Virginia Williams (born 1978), American actress
Vogue Williams (born 1986), Irish model and TV and radio personality

W
W. S. Gwynn Williams (1896–1978), Welsh musician
Wade Williams (born 1961), American actor
Wal Williams (1895–1982), Australian rules footballer for Hawthorn
Waldo Williams (1904–1971), Welsh poet
Wally Williams (water polo) (1921–2009), New Zealand water polo player
Wally Williams (American football) (born 1971), American footballer
Walt Williams (baseball) (1943–2016), Major League Baseball outfielder
Walt Williams (cornerback) (born 1954), American football player
Walt Williams (born 1970), American basketball player
Wayne Williams (born 1958), American murderer
Wendell Craig Williams (born 1965), American lawyer and politician
Wendell Williams (born 1968), Trinidadian sprinter and Olympic long jumper
 Wesley Williams (born 1968), Canadian rapper and actor known as Maestro
Whit Williams, American saxophonist
Whitney Williams, American businesswoman and philanthropist 
Willi Williams (born c.1956), Jamaican reggae and dub musician and producer
Woody Williams (infielder) (1912–1995), American baseball player
Woody Williams (born 1966), American baseball pitcher
Worrell Williams (born 1986), American football linebacker
Wyn Williams (born 1951), Welsh justice of the High Court

Y
Yorick Williams (born 1975), British basketball player
Yvette Williams (1929–2019), New Zealand field athlete

Z
Zac Williams (Australian footballer) (born 1994), Australian rules footballer
Zach Williams (musician), born 1981, American solo artist 
Zack Williams (born 1988), American football center
Zane Williams (born 1977), American country singer
Zelda Williams (born 1989), American actress
Ziaire Williams (born 2001), American basketball player
Zoe Williams (born 1973), English columnist, journalist and author
Zoe Williams (Gladiators) (born 1980), English TV 'Gladiator' Amazon

Fictional characters
Abigail Williams (As the World Turns), from the American soap opera
Anna Williams (Tekken), from the Tekken video game series
Ash Williams, from the Evil Dead franchise
Ashley Williams (Mass Effect), in the Mass Effect video game
Ben Williams (Family Affairs), in the British soap opera Family Affairs
Betty Williams (Coronation Street), in the British soap opera
Billy Williams (Coronation Street), in Coronation Street; married to Betty Williams
Brad Williams (EastEnders), from British soap opera EastEnders
Byron Williams (fictional character), in the 1996 film Mars Attacks!
Chrissie Williams, Christine Williams, on Holby City
Christine Williams (Tangle), on Tangle
Christine Blair, née Christine Williams, on The Young and the Restless
Cindy Williams (EastEnders), from British soap opera EastEnders
Conrad Williams (Family Affairs), in British soap opera Family Affairs
Dave Williams (Desperate Housewives), on the TV series Desperate Housewives
Doug Williams (Days of our Lives), on the soap opera Days of our Lives, played by Bill Hayes
Edie Williams née Britt, from Desperate Housewives
Gethin Williams minor character from the BBC soap opera Eastenders
Henry Williams (Casualty), from the BBC television drama Casualty
Jane Williams (EastEnders), from British soap opera EastEnders
Kenny Bruce Williams, in the Left Behind series
Mark Williams (Holby City), in Holby City
Mary Williams (The Young and the Restless), from the American soap opera
Michael Williams (Henry V), in William Shakespeare's Henry V
Michael Williams (Neighbours), from the soap opera Neighbours
Mitch Williams (General Hospital), in the soap opera General Hospital
Natasha Williams (Neighbours), from the Australian soap opera Neighbours
Nathan Williams (EastEnders), from the British soap opera EastEnders
Nina Williams, from the Tekken video game series
Paul Williams (character), on The Young and the Restless
 Reggie Williams, in sitcom Small Wonder
Rhys Williams (Torchwood), from the British science fiction series Torchwood
Ricky Williams (The Young and the Restless), from The Young and the Restless
Rory Williams, from Doctor Who
Sierra Williams, a character in the Canadian TV series Catwalk
Shelley Williams, from the British soap opera Emmerdale
Smash Williams (Brian Williams), in the television series Friday Night Lights
Terry Williams (Hollyoaks), on the British soap opera Hollyoaks
Tim Williams (fictional character), on the TV series Tangle
 Winston Williams, in the Netflix series 13 Reasons Why

Lists of people by surname